The Mica scandal began in 2011 in Ireland when defective concrete blocks used in the construction of homes and other buildings showed signs of cracking and decay. The blocks were found to contain more than the maximum permitted amount of the mineral mica. The majority of affected buildings were in County Donegal but at least three other counties were also impacted. The scandal led to calls for, and then the establishment of, a scheme to fund affected homeowners of the fault to repair, or demolish and rebuild, their homes. A similar issue with the presence of pyrite was identified in 2007, originating with a quarry in the east of Ireland, and legislation was enacted to address both of the issues similarly.

Issues
Muscovite (also known as common mica) can be found in rocks used to make concrete blocks. It is estimated that a presence of 1% of muscovite in concrete reduces the strength of the internal bonding by 5%, and further that such blocks bond poorly with cement paste. Mica can also absorb water and excess amounts of water can cause problems in cold winters as freezing and thawing damages the blocks.

More than five thousand houses, and an unknown number of office and other buildings, have been affected, with some owners moving out of their homes as they are no longer safe. The majority of affected homes are in County Donegal, but there are also some in County Mayo and elsewhere. Around the same time, the use of pyrite in construction caused similar issues for buildings in the East of Ireland. Cracking and bulging appeared in flooring concrete and other materials soon after construction. 

An expert panel reported to government in 2017 that the problems in these counties add to "the legacy of building failures or severe non-compliance concerns following the downturn in economic and construction activity in 2008, which exposed vulnerabilities in the building control system that was in place at that time".  The report included information from the National Standards Authority of Ireland that mica and other harmful impurities are limited to 1% of concrete blocks and this is covered by a statutory instrument. In some affected homes in Donegal, the amount of mica in samples was significantly above the limit, potentially up to 14%.  Companies producing building materials must comply with regulations such as the Building Control Regulations.

The report stated that building control authorities lacked the ability to test materials in-house and that all ability to enforce regulations was limited by local authority budgets.

Campaigning and resolution schemes

Defective Concrete Blocks Grant Scheme 
Campaigns seeking redress for the issue began in 2011.  Partly as a result, the Defective Block Scheme was opened in June 2020. The scheme offers five options, from replacing an external wall, with a limit of €49,500, to demolition and rebuilding, with a limit of €247,500.  433 people in Donegal had engaged with the scheme as of June 2021.  Campaigners pointed out that homeowners had to pay €5,000 for a mica test to apply to the scheme and that this was a barrier for those who were in financial difficulty. They also wanted the scheme to cover 100% of costs, instead of the proposed 90% of costs. The grant was updated in November 2021, with the limit increased to €420,000, and 100% cover for costs. Houses in Clare and Limerick were added to the scheme, with estimates suggesting that over one thousand homes could be affected in those counties. In June 2022, ministers were advised that the cost of the scheme could reach €3.65 billion if inflation remained high. A similar redress scheme was announced for those affected by pyrite usage in construction, similarly covering 100% of costs, but only for repair works.

Campaigning
Protest marches were held in Dublin in June and October 2021, with thousands of people reported to have attended. In 2022, the Donegal Mica Action Group confirmed that it would found a political party with the intention of running in the next Irish general election.

Impact on building block businesses
Cassidy Brothers, one of the companies that produced the blocks, was issued with an enforcement notice in October 2021 in relation to land in Cranford, County Donegal. The company was ordered to shut a concrete batching plant and storage yard. In November 2021 they were issued with an unauthorised development letter by Donegal County Council as they did not have planning permission to develop blocks at their site in Gransha, Buncrana.

References

External links
Report of the Expert Panel on concrete blocks - June 2017

Political scandals in the Republic of Ireland
Construction law
Building codes
Building engineering
Housing in the Republic of Ireland